4085 Weir, provisional designation , is a stony Eunomian asteroid from the central regions of the asteroid belt, approximately 10 kilometers in diameter. It was discovered on 13 May 1985, by astronomer Carolyn Shoemaker at the Palomar Observatory in California, United States. The asteroid was named after American geologist Doris Blackman Weir.

Orbit and classification 

Weir is a member of the Eunomia family, a prominent family of stony S-type asteroid and the largest one in the intermediate main belt with more than 5,000 members. It orbits the Sun in the central main-belt at a distance of 2.3–2.9 AU once every 4 years and 3 months (1,537 days; semi-major axis of 2.61 AU). Its orbit has an eccentricity of 0.11 and an inclination of 14° with respect to the ecliptic.

Physical characteristics 

In the Tholen classification, Weir is a common, stony S-type asteroid, which is also the overall spectral type for members of the Eunomia family.

Rotation period 

In May 2006, a rotational lightcurve of Weir was obtained from photometric observations by Brian Warner at his Palmer Divide Observatory in Colorado. Lightcurve analysis gave a rotation period of 14.602 hours with a brightness variation of 0.18 magnitude. A concurring period of 14.657 hours and an amplitude of 0.24 magnitude was measured by astronomers at the Palomar Transient Factory in May 2010.

Diameter and albedo 

According to the surveys carried out by the Japanese Akari satellite and the NEOWISE mission of NASA's Wide-field Infrared Survey Explorer, Weir measures between 9.221 and 9.66 kilometers in diameter and its surface has an albedo between 0.228 and 0.273.

The Collaborative Asteroid Lightcurve Link assumes a standard albedo for stony asteroids of 0.20 and calculates a diameter of 11.30 kilometers based on an absolute magnitude of 12.1.

Naming 

This minor planet was named after American planetary geologist with the United States Geological Survey, Doris Blackman Weir. The approved naming citation was published by the Minor Planet Center on 12 December 1989.

Notes

References

External links 
 Asteroid Lightcurve Database (LCDB), query form (info )
 Dictionary of Minor Planet Names, Google books
 Asteroids and comets rotation curves, CdR – Observatoire de Genève, Raoul Behrend
 Discovery Circumstances: Numbered Minor Planets (1)-(5000) – Minor Planet Center
 
 

004085
Discoveries by Carolyn S. Shoemaker
Named minor planets
19850513